Jason Demetriou may refer to:

Jason Demetriou (rugby league) (born 1976), Australian born Greek Cyptiot rugby league footballer and coach
Jason Demetriou (footballer) (born 1987), English-born Cypriot association footballer